Nikita Andreyevich Kotin (born 1 September 2002) is a Russian football player. He plays for FC Sokol Saratov on loan from FC Rostov.

Club career
He was raised in the youth teams of PFC Krylia Sovetov Samara and was first included in their Russian Premier League roster in the 2018–19 season, but was never called up to the senior team.

In early 2020 he moved to PFC CSKA Moscow on a 3.5-year contract. He appeared on the bench in most of their senior squad games in that year, but did not appear on the field. On 25 February 2021, he was loaned to Russian Football National League club FC Irtysh Omsk until the end of the season.

He made his debut in the FNL for Irtysh on 6 March 2021 in a game against FC Alania Vladikavkaz.

On 1 July 2021, his contract with CSKA was terminated by mutual consent.

On 30 June 2022, Kotin joined FC Sokol Saratov on a season-long loan from FC Rostov.

International career
He represented Russia in all 3 games at the 2019 UEFA European Under-17 Championship. Russia lost all the games and was eliminated at group stage.

Career statistics

References

External links
 
 Profile by Russian Football National League

2002 births
Sportspeople from Samara, Russia
Living people
Russian footballers
Russia youth international footballers
Association football defenders
PFC Krylia Sovetov Samara players
PFC CSKA Moscow players
FC Irtysh Omsk players
FC Rostov players
FC Sokol Saratov players
Russian First League players
21st-century Russian people